The Janet Jennings House is located in Monroe, Wisconsin.

History
The house built in the early 1870s. Janet Jennings went to Washington in 1863 to care for her brother who was wounded at Chancellorsville. There she worked with Clara Barton, and ended up managing a unit of hospital tents. She later wrote for major newspapers and organized another hospital at Santiago during the Spanish–American War.

The house was listed on the National Register of Historic Places in 1976 and on the State Register of Historic Places in 1989.

References

Houses on the National Register of Historic Places in Wisconsin
National Register of Historic Places in Green County, Wisconsin
Houses in Green County, Wisconsin
Italianate architecture in Wisconsin
American Foursquare architecture
Houses completed in 1870
1870 establishments in Wisconsin